Mauser Model 1954 may refer to:
 The Mexican Mauser Model 1954
 The Brazilian Mauser Model 1954 or Mosquetão Itajubá M954, a Mauser Model 1908 variant